D.J. Kane (born 1964, Newry, County Down) is a former Gaelic footballer from Northern Ireland. He played with his local club Newry Mitchels but moved to Newry Shamrocks and was a member of the Down senior inter-county team from the 1980s until the 1990s. Kane captained Down to the All-Ireland title in 1994.

Personal life

His brother Val had been a substitute on the Down team that won the All-Ireland title in 1968.

He is the uncle of Irish actress Valene Kane.

Honours
 Dr. McKenna Cup (5) 1987 1989 1992 1996 1998
 Ryan Cup (3) 1987 1988 1989
 Railway Cup (3) 1993 1994 1995
 Ulster Senior Football Championship (2) 1991 1994 (C)
 All-Ireland Senior Football Championship (2) 1991 1994 (C)
 Sigerson Cup (2) 1986 1987 (C)
 Down Minor Football Championship (1)1981 1982 
 Ulster Under-21 Football Championship (1) 1984
 GAA GPA All Stars Awards (1) 1994
 MacRory Cup (1) 1982
 Down Senior Football League (1) 1997
 National Football League Division 2 (1) 1988
 National Football League Division 3 (1) 1997

References

 

1964 births
Living people
All-Ireland-winning captains (football)
Down inter-county Gaelic footballers
Newry Mitchels Gaelic footballers
Sportspeople from Newry
Tír Chonaill Gaels Gaelic footballers
Ulster inter-provincial Gaelic footballers
Winners of two All-Ireland medals (Gaelic football)